Do It Best Corp., formerly known as Hardware Wholesalers, Inc. (HWI), is a member-owned hardware, lumber, and building materials cooperative based in Fort Wayne, Indiana. Do it Best Corp. is the second-largest co-op in the industry with over $5 billion in annual sales. Do it Best Corp. does not mandate store identities, so member-owners may or may not display the Do it Best brand name in their businesses.

History 
HWI was founded by Arnold Gerberding in 1945 in Fort Wayne, Indiana, with the investments of 100 independent business owners in Illinois, Indiana, Michigan and Ohio. Gerberding used the co-op model so HWI members could get better volume pricing from vendors by buying together rather than on their own. Independent hardware stores became members of the cooperative and its sole shareholders as well. The first warehouse facility opened in 1948, and HWI added a private truck delivery system in 1955. When Gerberding retired in 1967, HWI had more than 600 members and is approaching $4 billion in annual sales.

Don Wolf succeeded Gerberding and opened HWI's first distribution center outside of Fort Wayne in Cape Girardeau, Missouri. Today, there are eight centers located across the US as well as five regional lumber offices.

Mike McClelland succeeded Don Wolf as president in 1992. During his tenure, the co-op expanded internationally, primarily in Central and South America and the Caribbean. In 1998, HWI combined with Our Own Hardware, a Minnesota-based regional co-op. As a result of the merger, HWI changed its name to Do it Best Corp. In 2002, Bob Taylor, a former member-owner with stores in Virginia Beach, Virginia, took over as president and CEO and has led the company into new markets supporting commercial/industrial and web-only businesses until his retirement in January 2016. Taylor embraced the pace of technology development and change at Do it Best Corp. Following Taylor’s retirement in early 2016, Dan Starr became the company’s fifth president and CEO.

References

External Links
Do it Best Corporate Website
Do it Best Retail Website

Hardware stores of the United States
Retailers' cooperatives in the United States
American companies established in 1945
Retail companies established in 1945
Organizations established in 1945
Companies based in Fort Wayne, Indiana
Companies based in Indiana
Allen County, Indiana
1945 establishments in Indiana